The Man from Planet X is a 1951 independently made American black-and-white science fiction horror film, produced by Jack Pollexfen and Aubrey Wisberg, directed by Edgar G. Ulmer, that stars Robert Clarke, Margaret Field, and William Schallert. The film was distributed by United Artists.

A scientist is monitoring a mysterious "Planet X" that has entered the Solar System and is now near Earth. A spaceship from the planet lands, and a space-suited humanoid emerges who speaks in musical tones. The alien makes contact with a small pocket of humanity in an isolated, fog-shrouded Scottish moor. Meanwhile, the scientist only wants to exploit the spaceman's specialized knowledge for his own selfish ends.

Plot
A spaceship from a previously unknown planet lands in the Scottish moors, bringing a humanoid alien to Earth near the observatory of Professor Elliot (Raymond Bond), just days before the mysterious Planet X will pass closest to our planet. When the professor and his friend, American reporter John Lawrence (Robert Clarke), discover the spaceman, they help it when it is in distress and try to communicate with it, failing in their attempt. They leave, and the alien follows them. A colleague of the professor, the unscrupulous and ambitious scientist Dr. Mears (William Schallert), discovers that the humanoid speaks in musical tones and tries to force from it the metal formula for its spaceship. He shuts off its breathing apparatus and leaves the spaceman for dead, telling the professor that communication was hopeless.

Soon, Lawrence discovers that the alien is gone, as is the professor's daughter, Enid (Margaret Field). Tommy, the seaside village's constable (Roy Engle), reports that others are now missing as well. Lawrence takes the constable to the site where the spaceship had landed, but it is no longer there. With more villagers now missing, including Mears, and with the phone lines suddenly dead and the village in a panic, they are finally able get word to Scotland Yard by using a heliograph to contact a passing freighter just off the coast.

When an Inspector (David Ormont) and a sergeant fly in and are briefed on the situation, it is decided that the military must destroy the spaceship. Lawrence objects that doing so will also kill the people who are now under the alien's control. With the planet due to reach its closest approach to Earth at midnight, Lawrence is given until 11:00pm to rescue them. He sneaks up to the alien ship and learns from Mears that the spaceman intends to use its ship as a wireless relay station in advance of an invasion coming from the approaching planet, which we also learn is a dying world. Lawrence orders the enthralled villagers to leave and attacks the alien, shutting off its breathing apparatus, then escapes with Enid and the professor. Mears, however, returns to the spaceship and is killed when the military opens fire and destroys it, shortly before the planet is nearest Earth. No invasion happens and the mysterious Planet X slowly exits the solar system for deep space.

Cast

 Robert Clarke as John Lawrence
 Margaret Field as Enid Elliot
 Raymond Bond as Professor Elliot
 William Schallert as Dr. Mears
 Roy Engel as Tommy the Constable
 Charles Davis as Georgie, man at dock
 Gilbert Fallman as Dr. Robert Blane
 David Ormont as Inspector Porter
 June Jeffery as Wife of missing man
 Franklyn Farnum as Sgt. Ferris, Porter's assistant (uncredited)

Cast notes
 Actor Pat Goldin and dwarf actor Billy Curtis have both been rumored to be the unknown actor who played the role of the alien space visitor in the film. However, Robert Clarke, who is frequently named as the source of the Pat Goldin rumor, never actually knew the name of the actor who played the role of the alien, nor did the other cast members, including Margaret Field and William Schallert. Furthermore, the unknown actor who played the alien role was noticeably taller than Billy Curtis. Cast member Robert Clarke recalls only that he was of Jewish origin, stood about five feet tall, and was once part of an acrobatic vaudeville act. Margaret Field and producer Jack Pollexfen later recalled only that he had complained about his uncomfortable costume and his low pay, while William Schallert remembered him only as a very small, interesting-looking middle-aged man who wasn't much of an actor. Robert Clarke was paid $350/week for his work on this film.

Production
The film went into production on December 13, 1950, at Hal Roach Studios in Culver City, California, and wrapped principal photography six days later. In order to save money, the film was shot on sets for the 1948 Ingrid Bergman film Joan of Arc, using artificial fog to change moods, plot locations, and to hide the lack of backdrops and staged landscapes for the outdoor scenes.

In popular culture

Invaders from Mars, The War of the Worlds, both released in 1953, and The Thing from Another World (1951), all began production around the same time this film was made. The Day the Earth Stood Still finished production six months prior, in the summer of 1951.
 The alien can communicate using only modulated musical sounds, a concept used in 1977 in Steven Spielberg's film Close Encounters of the Third Kind.
 The alien appears alongside other film monsters in the 2003 film Looney Tunes: Back in Action, in the scene that occurs at Area 52.

References
Notes

Bibliography
 Warren, Bill. Keep Watching the Skies, American Science Fiction Movies of the 50s, Vol I: 1950–1957. Jefferson, North Carolina: McFarland & Company, 1982. .

External links

 
 
 
 
 Joe Dante on The Man from Planet X at Trailers from Hell

1951 films
American science fiction horror films
American black-and-white films
Films directed by Edgar G. Ulmer
Films set in Scotland
1950s science fiction horror films
United Artists films
Films adapted into comics
Alien invasions in films
Films produced by Aubrey Wisberg
Films with screenplays by Aubrey Wisberg
1950s English-language films
1950s American films